Palangi or Palangī  is a village in Shabankareh Rural District, Shabankareh District, Dashtestan County, Bushehr Province, Iran. 

At the 2006 census, the village's population was 573, spread over 100 families.

References 

Populated places in Dashtestan County